Canada Malting Silos is one of two remaining silos in Toronto's Harbourfront in Ontario, Canada. Located at the foot of Bathurst Street at Bathurst Quay (Eireann Quay), the silos were built in 1928 to store malt for the Canada Malting Company. It was an important work of industrial architecture, as grain elevators had long been built out of wood, and thus were at great danger of fire. The concrete malting towers were an innovation, and the stark functionalism of the prominent building was an early influence on modernist architecture. A round office was added in 1944 and glass office was built in the original construction in 1928.

It was abandoned in the 1980s and destined for demolition, but it was designated a heritage site by the city of Toronto. A group called Metronome Canada Incorporated, led by President John Harris, hoped to convert the silos into a music museum or theme park. The city of Toronto is also considering it as a location for a municipal history museum.

Demolition of the germination and kiln buildings began early September 2010. The silos will be left standing, eventually being incorporated into future developments on the site. The municipality has not yet decided exactly what will be done with the space once the demolition project is complete.

See also
 Canada Malting Silos, Montreal
 Victory Soya Mills Silos – still standing
 Maple Leaf Mills Silos – demolished 1983

Notes

References

 Canada Malting Silos
 N*tropy – Canada Malting Silos

Buildings and structures in Toronto
Grain elevators in Canada
Harbourfront, Toronto
Industrial buildings completed in 1928